is a Japanese speed skater. She competed in three events at the 1980 Winter Olympics.

References

1962 births
Living people
Japanese female speed skaters
Olympic speed skaters of Japan
Speed skaters at the 1980 Winter Olympics
Sportspeople from Aichi Prefecture